Tomás Fernández Ríos (born 27 February, 1969) is a Spanish businessman and politician who is a member of the Congress of Deputies for Vox.

Biography
Ríos is a native of Madrid. He studied law at the Complutense University of Madrid and a master's in business marketing at ESIC University before working as a company director. He was a member of the People's Party before joining Vox due to disagreeing with the PP's stance on handling matters in the Basque Country.

Ríos ran as a candidate for the Huelva constituency during the May 2019 general election in Spain for Vox, but was unsuccessful at first getting elected. However, he ran again in the November election of the same year and was elected as a deputy in the province.

References 

1969 births
Living people
Members of the 14th Congress of Deputies (Spain)
Vox (political party) politicians
People from Madrid